Yaren İzzet Sözer (born 19 April 1997), is an Australian professional footballer who plays as a goalkeeper for Central Coast Mariners.

Playing career

Club

Central Coast Mariners
Sözer signed for A-League Men side Central Coast Mariners in October 2021 as a backup goalkeeper to Mark Birighitti. He made his debut for the Mariners in a win over Wollongong Wolves on 1 December 2021 in the 2021 FFA Cup, coming on after 20 minutes when Birighitti was sent off. With Birighitti suspended, Sözer made his A-League Men debut in the following game against Macarthur, however, he was forced from the field in the first half due to injury.

International
Sozer played for the Australia under-20 side in a win over Myanmar at the 2016 AFF U-19 Youth Championship on 14 September 2016.

Personal life
Born in Australia, Sözer is of Turkish descent and holds a Turkish passport.

Honours
Melbourne City
National Youth League: 2016–17

References

External links

1997 births
Living people
Soccer players from Melbourne
Australian soccer players
Australian people of Turkish descent
Association football goalkeepers
Melbourne City FC players
Central Coast Mariners FC players
Perak F.C. players
National Premier Leagues players
A-League Men players
Australian expatriate soccer players
Australian expatriate sportspeople in Malaysia
Citizens of Turkey through descent
Expatriate footballers in Malaysia